Huťka is a Czech surname. In Slovakia the name is Hutka. Notable people with the surname include:

 Jaroslav Hutka (born 1947), Czech musician, composer, songwriter, and activist
 Pavel Huťka (born 1949), Czech tennis player and trainer

Czech-language surnames